Donaspastus ubangi is a moth in the family Autostichidae. It was described by László Anthony Gozmány in 1966. It is found in the Central African Republic.

References

Endemic fauna of the Central African Republic
Moths described in 1966
Donaspastus